The Bosnia and Herzegovina men's national water polo team represents Bosnia and Herzegovina in international water polo competitions and friendly matches. It is governed by the Water Polo Federation of Bosnia and Herzegovina since 2013.

The Bosnia and Herzegovina men's national team's historic first game took place during Sarajevo Champions Challenge 2016 on 23 September 2016.

The player roster is composed of players from clubs from BiH's only coastal city of Neum, and the two largest cities - Sarajevo and Banja Luka. Neum is the only city to be situated along Bosnia and Herzegovina's  of coastline, making it the country's only access to the Adriatic Sea and marking an ideal location for sport expansion.

Results

Current squad

Players called up for Sarajevo Champions Challenge 2016 on 23 September 2016.

Head coach:  Slobodan Grahovac

Reserves

 Srđan Jolić (VK Banja Luka), 
 Kristian Njavro (HVK Jadran Neum), 
 Mihael Crnčević (HVK Jadran Neum), 
 Armin Mezit (Akademija B Sarajevo).

Head coaches
 Ivica Bačić (2009)
 Slobodan Grahovac (2016-present)

Gallery
Bosnia and Herzegovina's three main courts for water polo are Olimpijski Bazen Otoka (Sarajevo), Gradski Olimpijski Bazen (Banja Luka), and a water polo court inside the Adriatic Sea water in Neum.

See also
 Yugoslavia men's national water polo team
 VK Bosna
 Swimming Association of Bosnia and Herzegovina

References

External links
Plivački savez Bosne i Hercegovine (official website)
Water polo federation BiH
BiH Water polo Association Facebook page
Olympic pool Sarajevo

Men's national water polo teams
National water polo teams in Europe
National water polo teams by country
Water polo men
 
Men's sport in Bosnia and Herzegovina